The Women's junior time trial of the 2014 UCI Road World Championships took place in and around Ponferrada, Spain on 22 September 2014.

The world title was won by Australian rider Macey Stewart, who became the fourth Australian rider to win the event. Stewart won the gold medal by 10.79 seconds ahead of Denmark's Pernille Mathiesen, while the bronze medal went to Australia's Anna-Leeza Hull – 13.31 seconds in arrears of Stewart – after edging out a third Australian rider, Alexandra Manly, by half a second.

Qualification

All National Federations were allowed to enter four riders for the race, with a maximum of two riders to start. In addition to this number the current continental champions were also able to take part. The outgoing World Champion, Séverine Eraud, did not compete as she was no longer eligible to contest junior races.

Schedule
All times are in Central European Time (UTC+1).

Participating nations
49 cyclists from 29 nations took part in the women's junior time trial. The numbers of cyclists per nation is shown in parentheses.

  Australia (3)
  Belgium (1)
  Canada (1)
  Colombia (2)
  Czech Republic (1)
  Denmark (1)
  Egypt (2)
  Estonia (1)
  France (2)
  Germany (2)
  Great Britain (2)
  Ireland (1)
  Italy (2)
  Japan (2)
  Kazakhstan (2)
  Latvia (1)
  Lithuania (2)
  Mauritius (1)
  Netherlands (3)
  Poland (2)
  Russia (2)
  Slovakia (1)
  Slovenia (1)
  South Africa (2)
  Spain (2) (host)
  Sweden (2)
  Switzerland (2)
  United States (2)
  Uzbekistan (1)

Prize money
The UCI assigned premiums for the top 3 finishers with a total prize money of €1,380.

Final classification

References

Women's junior time trial
UCI Road World Championships – Women's junior time trial
2014 in women's road cycling